Xoser astonyx is a species of moth of the family Tortricidae found in Napo Province, Ecuador.

The wingspan is about 15 mm. The ground colour of the forewings is orange cream, suffused with orange in the terminating area near the costa. The remaining area of the wing is brownish grey with some darker shades and a similarly edged blotch of ground colour. The hindwings are cream, slightly tinged with brownish at the apex.

Etymology
The species name refers to the termination of the costa of the valve and is derived from a (a prefix expressing negation) and Greek stonyx (meaning a sharp process or thorn).

References

Moths described in 2010
Euliini
Moths of South America
Taxa named by Józef Razowski